John Clarence "Nap" Kloza (September 7, 1903 – June 11, 1962) was a professional baseball player and manager. Listed at 5' 11", 180 lb., he batted and threw right-handed. Sometimes he is credited as Jack Kloza.

Kloza is recognized as one of four Major League Baseball leaguers born in Poland, along with Moe Drabowsky, Henry Peploski and Johnny Reder. At age 28, it had been a long journey to the major leagues for Kloza.

While playing for the Montgomery Lions in 1926, Kloza led the Southeastern League with a .379 average and nine home runs in 114 games. Then, in 1927 he hit .404 with 28 homers in 122 games for the Albany Nuts in the same league. After that, he slugged .347 with 28 home runs in 1930 for the Wichita Falls Spudders of the Texas League, and .319 with 22 homers for the Milwaukee Brewers of the American Association in 1931, being promoted to the Browns late in the season.

Kloza was hailed as a potential Babe Ruth at that time, but his major league experience was cut short by illness, from which he never fully recovered his best playing strength, appearing in parts of two seasons. He was a .150 hitter in 22 games, driving in two runs and scoring five more without home runs.

In 1933 Kloza returned to the minors, playing for the Brewers during four seasons before retiring at age 32. In a 12-year minor league career, he hit .312 with 153 home runs and a .532 slugging average in 1217 games. Following his playing retirement, he promoted baseball activities for the youth. In 1944 he managed the Rockford Peaches of the All-American Girls Professional Baseball League, guiding his club a 25–23 record while finishing third out of four opponents.

Kloza was a longtime resident of Milwaukee, Wisconsin, where he died at the age of 58.

Sources

Major League Baseball outfielders
St. Louis Browns players
All-American Girls Professional Baseball League managers
Minor league baseball managers
Albany Nuts players
Alexandria Reds players
Birmingham Barons players
Blytheville Tigers players
Chattanooga Lookouts players
Longview Cannibals players
Louisville Colonels (minor league) players
Milwaukee Brewers (minor league) players
Montgomery Lions players
Nashville Vols players
Wichita Falls Spudders players
Major League Baseball players from Poland
Sportspeople from Warsaw
People from Warsaw Governorate
Polish emigrants to the United States
Congress Poland emigrants to the United States
Baseball players from Milwaukee
1903 births
1962 deaths
Burials in Wisconsin
Polish baseball players